As in the year before, there were two categories of riders in the 1911 Tour de France. The best riders started in sponsored teams; there were four teams, with 37 riders in total. The stages had checkpoints where riders had to sign, and on these checkpoints the sponsored riders were allowed to be given food and drinks. The other category consisted of 67 isolated riders; they were not allowed to be given food or drinks during these checkpoints.

The previous edition had been a close battle between teammates Octave Lapize and François Faber from the Alcyon team, won by Lapize. Lapize had changed teams to the La Française team, where he was joined by former winner Lucien Petit-Breton (winner in 1907 and 1908). Petit-Breton was a late replacement for Cyrille van Hauwaert, who was not feeling healthy enough to ride the Tour.

Cyclists

By team

By starting number

By nationality

References

1911 Tour de France
1911